Area 19 can refer to:

 Brodmann area 19
 Area 19 (Nevada National Security Site)